Adrian "Ace" Custis (born May 24, 1974) is an American basketball coach and former professional basketball player. He last played in Japan with the Wakayama Trians.  After a severe knee injury while trying out for the Dallas Mavericks, Ace became known as one of the best power forwards throughout Asia playing in such countries as Lebanon, Japan, Qatar, Indonesia, Syria and the Philippines. Ace made a further name for himself in prestigious clubs such as Al Riyadi where he won a championship. Ace graduated from Virginia Tech and won the 1995 NIT championship. In 1997, Ace was an NCAA All-American. In 2007, Ace was inducted into the Virginia Tech Sports Hall of Fame; his #20 jersey was retired and hangs alongside the NBA shooting great Dell Curry. Techhoops, a basketball publication, named Ace Custis one of the 10 greatest players ever in Virginia Tech history.

Custis was an assistant coach with the Maryland Eastern Shore Hawks men's basketball team from 2014 to 2019. He is a native of Eastville, Virginia and resides in Fruitland, Maryland.

In 2019 he was hired as the coordinator of basketball relations at Virginia Tech. In 2020 he was promoted to special assistant to the head coach.

References

1974 births
Living people
Al Riyadi Club Beirut basketball players
American expatriate basketball people in Japan
American expatriate basketball people in Lebanon
American expatriate basketball people in the Philippines
American expatriate basketball people in Qatar
American expatriate sportspeople in Indonesia
American men's basketball players
Basketball coaches from Virginia
Basketball players from Virginia
Grand Rapids Hoops players
Maryland Eastern Shore Hawks men's basketball coaches
People from Eastville, Virginia
People from Wicomico County, Maryland
Philippine Basketball Association imports
Power forwards (basketball)
San Miguel Beermen players
Virginia State Trojans men's basketball coaches
Virginia Tech Hokies men's basketball players
Wakayama Trians players